Muhammad Omar, and other spellings such as Mohamed Omer, may refer to the following people:

Sportspeople 
 Muhammad Umar (wrestler) (born 1975), Pakistani wrestler
 Mohammad Omar (footballer, born 1976), Emirati footballer
 Mohammed Omar (footballer, born 1983), Qatari footballer
 Muhammad Omar (footballer, born 1990), Pakistani footballer
 Mohamed Omar (soccer, born 1999), Canadian soccer player

Politicians 
 Mohamed Salih Omer (1934–1969), Sudanese politician
 Mohammad Iqbal Omar (born 1972), Iraqi politician
 Mohammad Omar (Afghan governor) (died 2010), Governor of Kunduz Province, Afghanistan
 Mullah Omar (died 2013), founder and former leader of the Taliban
 Mohamed Omer (Eritrean politician), interim foreign minister of Eritrea
 Mohammad Abdullahi Omar, Somali politician
 Mohammad Farid Omar, Afghan Taliban politician
 Muhammad Zubair Umar, Pakistani politician

Other people
 Mohammad Omar (musician) (1905–1980), Afghan musician and Rubab virtuoso
 Mohamed Omar (born 1976), Swedish poet who changed his name to Eddie Råbock in 2017
 Mohammed Omer (journalist) (born 1984), Palestinian journalist
 Mohamed Omar (mathematician), Egyptian-Canadian mathematician working in the United States

See also 

 Mohammad Umer Naimi (1893–1966), Pakistani Muslim scholar
 Muhammad Umar Memon (1939–2008), Pakistani literary scholar
 Mohammad Omar Daudzai (born 1957), Afghan politician
 Muhammad Umar Memon (born 1958), Egyptian footballer
 Mohamed Omar Hagi Mohamoud (born 1981), Somali diplomat
 Mohammad Omar Shishani (born 1989), Jordanian footballer
 Mohammed Omar Abdel-Rahman, Egyptian extrajudicial prisoner of the US
 Mohamed Omar Arte, Somali politician
 Omar Mohamed Omar (1970–2008), Somali basketball player
 Amin Omar (born 1985), Egyptian football referee
 Daud Mohamed Omar, Somali politician